Pippa Passes; or, The Song of Conscience is a 1909 silent short directed D. W. Griffith.  It was produced and distributed by the Biograph Company. It is based on a play Pippa Passes by Robert Browning.

It is preserved from a paper print.

Cast
Gertrude Robinson - Pippa
George Nichols - Pippa's Husband
Arthur V. Johnson - Luca
Marion Leonard - Ottima
Owen Moore - Sibald

continuing cast
Linda Arvidson - Greek Model
Clara T. Bracy - 
Adele DeGarde - 
James Kirkwood - In Bar
Anthony O'Sullivan - In Studio
Mary Pickford - Girl in Crowd
Billy Quirk - In Studio
Mack Sennett - In Studio
Henry B. Walthall -

References

External links
Pippa Passes at IMDb.com

1909 films
American silent short films
Biograph Company films
Films directed by D. W. Griffith
Robert Browning
American black-and-white films
Silent American drama films
1909 drama films
1900s American films